Sophie Barjac (born March 24, 1957 in Bourges, Cher) is a French actress of stage, screen and television.  Although most of her work is in the French language (e.g., Holiday Hotel), Barjac has occasionally acted in the English language: the Canadian television series Bordertown (1988-1990) and the Belgian-Polish coproduction Alice (1981).

Partial filmography 

 Isabelle and Lust (1975)
 À nous les petites Anglaises (1976)
 Anne, jour après jour (1976)
 Dis bonjour à la dame!.. (1977)
 Holiday Hotel (1978)
 Alice (1982 film) (1982)
 La fiancée qui venait du froid (1983)
 Love on the Quiet (1985)
 Lévy et Goliath (1987)
 Comme si de rien n'était (2003)
 Counter Investigation (2007)
 Nés en 68 (2008)

References 
 

1957 births
Living people
Actors from Bourges
French film actresses
French stage actresses
French television actresses
20th-century French actresses